Alena is a Swedish horror film directed by Daniel di Grado. It is based on the Swedish graphic novel Alena by Kim W. Andersson.

Reception
Dennis Harvey of Variety wrote that the film is a "polished and reasonably entertaining hunk of teen angst, but its familiar suspense elements rely heavily on a “twist” most viewers will see coming a mile off." Jennie Kermode wrote "Everything about this film is exquisite, from its gorgeously textured cinematography to the delicate performances of its stars. Nothing has been left to chance, and the result is compelling viewing."

External links

References

2015 films
2015 horror films
Films about bullying
Films based on Swedish comics
LGBT-related horror films
Live-action films based on comics
2010s Swedish-language films
Swedish horror films
2015 LGBT-related films
Swedish LGBT-related films
2010s Swedish films